Uropeltis pulneyensis, commonly known as the Indian earth snake and the Palni shieldtail, is a species of snake in the family Uropeltidae. The species is endemic to the Western Ghats of India.

Description
The following description of U. pulneyensis is after Beddome (1864: 180):

"rostral rather obtuse, produced back between the nasals, and touching the frontals [=prefrontals], nasals not meeting; eye small, in [the] front of the ocular shield; no supraorbitals; vertical [=frontal] 6-sided; occipitals [=parietals] rounded behind; 4 upper labials. Scales round the neck 19, round the body 17; subcaudals, male, about 12, female 6–8. Tail [laterally] compressed, ending in a small spinose keel, more or less bicuspid. Scales of the tail all smooth. Colour uniform earthy brown; a lateral bright yellow streak from the labials continued on each side of the trunk, about 1 or 1½ inch in length; a few minute yellow specks on the back; belly with broad bright yellow transverse bands, very irregular as to number and shape; yellow markings about the vent and tail."

Beddome (1864: 180) continues: "[pulneyensis and wynandensis] ... differ from the typical form of this genus in their much smaller size and in the absence of a supraorbital shield. As, however, they have the same [laterally] compressed tail, I prefer keeping them in this genus to making a new genus for them."

Boulenger (1893) adds the following details:

Adults may attain a total length of 38 cm (15 inches).

Portion of the rostral visible from above longer than its distance from the frontal. Frontal longer than broad. Diameter of the eye ½ the length of the ocular shield. Diameter of the body 30 to 38 times in the total length. Ventrals about twice as large as the contiguous scales, 161–180. Tail somewhat laterally compressed. Usually some of the terminal dorsal scales of the tail with faint keels.

Geographic range

Type locality of Plectrurus pulneyensis: "Pulneys at an elevation of 7,000 to 8,000 feet" (2,100–2,400 m).
Type locality of Silybura guentheri: "High Wavy mountain, Madurai district, 5000 feet elevation" (1,500 m).

Habitat
The preferred natural habitat of U. pulneyensis is forest, but it has also been found in tea plantations and gardens.

Behaviour
U. pulneyensis is terrestrial and fossorial.

Reproduction
U. pulneyensis is ovoviviparous.

References

Further reading

Beddome RH (1863). "Descriptions of New Species of the Family Uropeltidæ from Southern India, with Notes on other little-known Species". Proceedings of the  Zoological Society of London 1863: 225–229 + Plates XXV–XXVII. (Plectrurus pulneyensis, new species, p. 228 + Plate XXV, figure 2 [four views]).
Beddome RH (1864). "Descriptions of New Species of the Family Uropeltidæ from Southern India, with Notes on other little-known Species". Annals and Magazine of Natural History, Third Series 13: 177–180.
Beddome RH (1866). "Notes upon the snakes of the Madras Presidency. Description and plate of a new species of snake of the family Uropeltidae from the Pulney Mountains". Madras Quarterly Journal of Medical Science 9: 207–208 (228?). [Reprint: 1940. J. Soc. Bibliogr. Nat. Sci., London 1 (10): 314.]
Beddome RH (1878). "Description of six new Species of Snakes of the Genus Silybura, Family Uropeltidæ, from the Peninsula of India". Proc. Zool. Soc. London 1878: 800-802.
Beddome RH (1886). "An Account of the Earth-Snakes of the Peninsula of India and Ceylon". Ann. Mag. Nat. Hist., Fifth Series 17: 3–33.
Boulenger GA (1890). The Fauna of British India, Including Ceylon and Burma. Reptilia and Batrachia. London: Secretary of State for India in Council. (Taylor and Francis, printers). xviii + 541 pp. (Silybura pulneyensis, p. 260).
Günther ACLG (1864). The Reptiles of British India. London: The Ray Society. (Taylor and Francis, printers). xxvii + 452 pp. + Plates I–XXVI. (Rhinophis pulneyensis, pp. 187–188 + Plate XVII, figure C).
Sharma RC (2003). Handbook: Indian Snakes. Kolkata: Zoological Survey of India. 292 pp. .
Smith MA (1943). The Fauna of British India, Ceylon and Burma, Including the Whole of the Indo-Chinese Sub-region. Reptilia and Amphibia. Vol. III.—Serpentes. London: Secretary of State for India. (Taylor and Francis, printers). xii + 583 pp. (Uropeltis pulneyensis, p. 85).
Williams EE (1959). "The Occipito-vertebral Joint in the Burrowing Snakes of the Family Uropeltidae". Breviora (106): 1–10. (Uropeltis pulneyensis, figures 3A & 3B).

External links

Uropeltidae
Endemic fauna of the Western Ghats
Reptiles of India
Reptiles described in 1863
Taxa named by Richard Henry Beddome